In computational complexity theory and cryptography, averaging argument is a standard argument for proving theorems. It usually allows us to convert probabilistic polynomial-time algorithms into non-uniform polynomial-size circuits.

Example 
Example: If every person likes at least 1/3 of the books in a library, then the library has a book, which at least 1/3 of people like.

Proof: Suppose there are  people and  books. Each person likes at least  of the books. Let people leave a mark on the book they like. Then, there will be at least  marks. The averaging argument claims that there exists a book with at least  marks on it. Assume, to the contradiction, that no such book exists. Then, every book has fewer than  marks.

Formalized definition of averaging argument 

Let X and Y be sets, let p be a predicate on X × Y and let f be a real number in the interval [0, 1]. If for each x in X and at least f |Y| of the elements y in Y satisfy p(x, y), then there exists a y in Y such that there exist at least f |X| elements x in X that satisfy p(x, y).

There is another definition, defined using the terminology of probability theory.

Let  be some function.

Indeed, for every  define  to be  then

 

Application 
This argument has wide use in complexity theory (e.g. proving ) and cryptography (e.g. proving that indistinguishable encryption results in semantic security). A plethora of such applications can be found in Goldreich's books.

References 

Computational complexity theory
Circuit complexity
Randomized algorithms
Theory of cryptography